Marcos Luis Arturia (born 8 February 1998) is an Argentine professional footballer who plays as a forward for Talleres.

Career
Arturia spent time in the youth system of Deportivo Español. In 2014, Arturia appeared in Torneo Federal B with San Martín, which preceded a spell in the same competition in 2015 with Deportivo Montecaseros; scoring one goal in ten matches. Primera B Nacional side Talleres signed Arturia at the beginning of 2016. He featured for the club's academy at the 2018 U-20 Copa Libertadores, netting against São Paulo as Talleres were eliminated at the group stages. On 23 November 2018, with the club now in the Argentine Primera División, Arturia made his professional debut during a victory away to Argentinos Juniors.

After one further appearance for Talleres, Arturia subsequently departed on loan in July 2019 to Primera B Nacional's Villa Dálmine. He scored on his competitive debut for them, netting in a 2–0 win over Instituto on 17 August.

Career statistics
.

References

External links

1998 births
Living people
Sportspeople from Mendoza Province
Argentine footballers
Association football forwards
Argentine Primera División players
Primera Nacional players
San Martín de Mendoza footballers
Talleres de Córdoba footballers
Villa Dálmine footballers